Provincetown Public Schools, also known as Provincetown School District, or Provincetown IB Schools, is the school district of Provincetown, Massachusetts, serving grades Kindergarten through 8.

The district previously covered all grades, including Provincetown High School (7-12). The school's athletic nickname was the Fishermen and the school colors were black and orange. That facility became an International Baccalaureate Public Middle school on June 7, 2013, following the graduation ceremony of the final senior high school class of the old Provincetown High School. The high school building is now used for grades 1-8. PYP1 through MYP3 students. Younger students, 6 weeks through Pre-School, Pre-Kindergarten and Kindergarten are around the corner in the Veterans Memorial Elementary School and the Early Learning Center.

The K-8 school is located at 12 Winslow Street, and is an International Baccalaureate World School offering the IB program to Kindergarten through Middle Years Program 3 students, aged 3–15. Provincetown IB Schools accepts school choice students from a region that includes Yarmouth, Massachusetts.

History
Circa 1998 the junior-senior high school had 168 students.

In 1999 the district had 214 elementary school students and 114 junior-senior high students. In 2009 the district had 118 elementary school students and 54 high school students.

High school closure
In 2010 the school regionalization planning committee recommended to close Provincetown High, move elementary grades into the building, and have only preschool at the former Veterans Memorial Elementary.

In 2010, the school committee voted unanimously to phase out the high school students in Provincetown High School due to declining enrollment. High-school students who live in Provincetown are now redistricted to attend Nauset Regional High School (of Nauset Public Schools). Other area options include Sturgis Charter Public School and Cape Cod Regional Technical High School. PHS had one of the smallest high school enrollments in the country its last two years.

By 2012 the 9th and 10th grade students were already moved to Nauset Regional while 11th and 12th grade students remained at Provincetown High. In 2012 there were 14 students enrolled, all female, for grades 11 and 12. Provincetown High School's last senior class graduated on June 7, 2013. The final Senior class numbered eight.

K-8 era
In 2014 the K-8 School had 109 students. In 2019 it had 125 students. That year superintendent Beth Singer retired.

By 2018 the school had 125 students.

Academics
Prior to its closing, 100% of the school's senior classes had passed the MCAS test each year from 2003 to 2009 with a 100% Competency Determination.

The school's location in a well-established art colony township provided opportunities for students interested in the visual or performing arts.

Sports
PHS fielded teams in basketball, soccer, softball, and tennis. Provincetown played other Cape Cod teams in the "Lighthouse League".

One of Provincetown's greatest athletic achievements was when the varsity baseball team defeated a much bigger and more talented Mashpee High School team in the 2005 Massachusetts State Playoffs Quarterfinal Round. Provincetown had an enrollment of around 100 students in grades 7–12 at the time, while Mashpee had an enrollment of over 1,000 students. Provincetown defeated Mashpee 7-6 in extra innings and advanced all the way to the Division 3 State Semi-Finals with the victory, the deepest any athletics team at Provincetown had gone in the playoffs in over 15 years.

Schools
Previously the district had two schools, Veterans Memorial Elementary School and Provincetown High School.

By 2012 Veterans Memorial Elementary School was being refurbished to be Veterans Memorial Community Center, but it remains active as a school building as it houses the preschool and kindergarten classes for Provincetown Schools. In 2018 the preschool had 15 students.

The current 1-8 building, a.k.a. the former high school building, was dedicated in 1938.

See also
 Non-high school district (for the post-2013 period)

References

External links

Schools in Barnstable County, Massachusetts
Provincetown, Massachusetts
School districts in Massachusetts
School districts established in 2013